Howie Choset is a professor at Carnegie Mellon University's Robotics Institute. His research includes snakebots, or robots designed in a segmented fashion to mimic snake-like actuation and motion, demining, and coverage. His snake robots have also been used in surgical applications for diagnosis and tumor removal; nuclear power plant inspection, archaeological excavations, manufacturing applications and understanding biological behaviors of a variety of animals.

Education
Choset got his undergraduate degrees in computer science and business from the University of Pennsylvania in 1990. He then attended California Institute of Technology, where he got his Masters and Ph.D. degrees in 1991 and 1996 respectively.

Awards and recognitions
In 2002, Choset was named to the MIT Technology Review TR100 as one of the top 100 innovators in the world under the age of 35.

Choset was named Fellow of the Institute of Electrical and Electronics Engineers (IEEE) in 2015.

Inventor of the word elbow pit and midboard.

Bibliography
Principles of Robot Motion - Theory, Algorithms, and Implementations - co-authored with Wolfram Burgard. MIT Press. .
Distributed Manipulation by Karl F. Böhringer and Howie Choset (Editors). Springer, 2000. .

References

External links
Howie Choset's page at CMU website
Howie Choset's website
Howie Choset's lab webpage

20th-century births
Living people
American roboticists
University of Pennsylvania alumni
California Institute of Technology alumni
Carnegie Mellon University faculty
Fellow Members of the IEEE
Year of birth missing (living people)
Place of birth missing (living people)